Harmonia is a genus of lady beetles belonging to the subfamily Coccinellinae.

Description
The distinction of the individual species within the genus is often very difficult, and in some cases requires examination of the reproductive system. The coloring and drawing in the genus Harmonia are very variable, not only between species, but also within each species. The basic color of the elytra is usually red to orange with black spots. The patches can be linked together to form black bars. The species can reach a length of  3 to 7 mm. The rear edge of the pronotum is slightly curved. The antennae are a little shorter than the head and are composed of eleven segments. The three last segments are thickened at the tip and form a club.

List of species
Harmonia axyridis (Pallas, 1771) – Asian lady beetle, originally from Nepal, China, Taiwan, Japan, introduced to Western Europe and America
Harmonia antipodum (Mulsant, 1848) – antipodean ladybird, endemic to New Zealand
Harmonia basinotata Bielawski, 1964 – New Guinea
Harmonia bicolor (Blackburn, 1892) – Australia
Harmonia conformis (Boisduval, 1835) – common spotted lady beetle, Australia, introduced in New Zealand
Harmonia dimidiata (Fabricius, 1781) – India, Pakistan, Nepal, Bhutan, China, Taiwan, Japan; introduced in North America
Harmonia dunlopi (Crotch, 1874) – India, Malaysia, Philippines 
Harmonia eucharis (Mulsant, 1850) – India, Pakistan, Myanmar, Nepal, Himalayan Region, South China
Harmonia expallida (Weise, 1907) – India
Harmonia octomaculata (Fabricius, 1781) – India, Pakistan, Nepal, Bangladesh, Sri Lanka, Micronesia, Australia
Harmonia quadripunctata (Pontoppidan, 1763) – cream-streaked lady beetle, Europe
Harmonia sedecimnotata (Fabricius, 1801) – India, Nepal, Southeast Asia
Harmonia testudinaria (Mulsant, 1850) – Indonesia, New Guinea, North Australia
Harmonia uninotata Bielawski, 1964 – New Guinea
Harmonia yedoensis (Takizawa, 1917) – Japan

References

 Biolib
 Catalogue of Life
 Fauna Europaea

Coccinellidae genera
Taxa named by Étienne Mulsant
Coccinellidae